Luke Hines (born 4 May 1982 in Hoddesdon, Hertfordshire) is a British auto racing driver. He is the son of former karting champion and Zip Kart founder/owner Martin Hines.

Career

After a small amount of open wheel racing in Formula Ford, Hines entered the Production Class of the BTCC in 2003, with the Barwell Motorsport team. He was the class champion in a field of five full-time drivers. He did enough to be noticed by Vauxhall, who signed him for a 2004 assault on the Touring Class, when he won 2 races and finished 10th overall. In 2005 he switched to the SEAT team, moving up a place to 9th with 1 race win. For 2006 he moved to the British GT Championship driving a Panoz Esperante for the LNT team. He immediately established himself as one of the front runners along with his team mate Tom Kimber-Smith and led the championship after a pair of wins at Mondello Park. Hines and Kimber-Smith ended the year second in the standings, missing out on the title by just two points. Hines returned to British GT in 2008, partnering Jeremy Metcalfe in a Ferrari F430 GT3 and finishing runner-up a second time. He raced partial seasons in 2012, 2013 and for a final year in 2014, in which he earned a podium at Rockingham Motor Speedway.

Hines has established kart racing team AllStars Racing, announcing in April 2018 that he would be working with 10-year-old Deaf racer Caleb McDuff in preparation for McDuff's campaign in the 2018 Super 1 National Kart Championships.

Racing record

Complete British Touring Car Championship results
(key) (Races in bold indicate pole position – 1 point awarded in first race, 2003 in class) (Races in italics indicate fastest lap – 1 point awarded all races, 2003 in class) (* signifies that driver lead race for at least one lap – 1 point awarded all races)

* Season still in progress.

References

1982 births
Living people
British Touring Car Championship drivers
FIA GT Championship drivers
British GT Championship drivers
People from Hoddesdon
Formula Ford drivers
24 Hours of Daytona drivers
European Le Mans Series drivers
Porsche Supercup drivers
24 Hours of Spa drivers
CRS Racing drivers
United Autosports drivers
Cupra Racing drivers
Boutsen Ginion Racing drivers